The CPBL–KBO Club Championship was contested between the champions of Chinese Professional Baseball League's Taiwan Series, and the Korea Baseball Organization's Korean Series.

Game results

References

 
International baseball competitions in Asia